Shout About TV is a DVD trivia game by ODVD and Hasbro, as a follow-up to their "Shout About Movies" and "Shout About Music" games. Each disc contains 3 games; two volumes were released.

Background & release
Kristin Adams, from American Idol, is the game's host. Both volumes of "Shout About TV" were released on 24 August 2005, three weeks after the release of "Shout About Music." Hasbro promoted the game, alongside Shout About Music, as among its releases for the 2005 holiday season.

Critical reception
The game was met with mostly-positive reviews from critics. The staff of Entertainment Weekly awarded the game a "B" and praised the game's "hysterical fun," but commented that the game is more difficult that "Shout About Movies," and expressed dismay over the fact that each disc contains only three games. Nights and Weekends' Angela Dalecki praised the variety of shows included but, like Entertainment Weekly, was disappointed by the fact that each disc includes only three games.

Credits

Host
 Kristin Adams
Voice-overs
 Paul Mercier
Director
 Ethan Shaftel
Producers
 Norman Beil
 Chris Kantrowitz
 Alex Rose

Writers
 Hillel Aron	
 Norman Beil	
 Aris Blevins	
 Jamison Selby

References

Quiz games
Shout About games